Edward Henryk Materski (6 January 1923 – 24 March 2012) was a Polish prelate of the Catholic Church who served from 1992 to 1999.

Biography
Edward Henryk Materski was born in Vilnius and ordained a priest on 20 May 1947. Materski was appointed auxiliary bishop of the Diocese of Kielce as well as titular bishop of Aquae Sirenses on 29 October 1968, and ordained bishop on 22 December 1968. Materski was appointed bishop of the Diocese of Sandomierz on 6 March 1991, and would be appointed to the Diocese of Radom on 25 March 1992. Materski retired from the diocese of Radom on 28 June 1999, and died in Radom aged 89.

See also

Diocese of Radom
Diocese of Kielce
Diocese of Sandomierz

References

External links
 Kielce Diocese
 Sandomierz Diocese
Radom Diocese

1923 births
2012 deaths
20th-century Roman Catholic bishops in Poland
21st-century Roman Catholic bishops in Poland
Clergy from Vilnius
Recipients of the Pro Memoria Medal